The Marjorie Barrick Museum of Art (MSM; formerly known as the Marjorie Barrick Museum of Natural History) is a museum located on the main campus of the University of Nevada, Las Vegas (UNLV), established in 1967.  The museum was originally instituted as a natural history museum with a focus on the natural history and environment of Nevada and the broader Southwestern United States. In December 2011, the Barrick joined the UNLV College of Fine Arts and became the anchor of the Galleries at UNLV. The six galleries and one museum that make up the Galleries are each entities in their own right linked via a common administration. The Marjorie Barrick Museum of Art (the Barrick), is a well-known venue for engaging exhibitions and events and promotes engagement with the visual arts among a broad community including UNLV students, faculty, and staff; the greater Las Vegas community; and the national and international art community.

History

The founding of a natural history museum at the university—then an institution only a decade old, known as Nevada Southern University—began with a collection of specimens from the Desert Research Institute (DRI), the Nevada System of Higher Education's graduate research institute. In September 1967, the DRI opened a small museum facility in premises across from the university's grounds, as part of an expansion of DRI's activities into southern Nevada. The museum was created under the direction of archaeologist Richard H. Brooks, assistant research professor at the university and a researcher (later director) of the DRI-affiliated Nevada Archaeological Survey. Its exhibits consisted of DRI's local collection of living desert animal specimens and Native American artifacts.

In 1969 the university took over the management of the museum from DRI. Brooks remained as director of the university-affiliated museum, and during his tenure, the museum's funding was established and further permanent exhibits acquired. The most significant acquisition occurred in 1979, when a private collection of pre-Columbian art was donated by a former UNLV alumna, Mannetta Braunstein, and her husband Michael. These pieces would form the basis of a broadening collection of Mesoamerican and Aridoamerican cultural artifacts, acquired through other donations and further additions from the Braunsteins' purchases in Latin American markets.

In the late 1970s, the museum began the process of relocating to premises situated on the UNLV campus, to occupy a building that had contained the university's original gymnasium. Renovations to accommodate the museum were completed in 1981. Further alterations and expansions to the building were subsequently undertaken, and a research laboratory wing was added in 1994.

Beginning in 1979 the museum's anthropological collections were greatly expanded, with the subsequent additions of donated collections of ethnographic and archaeological artifacts representing  Native American and pre-Columbian Mesoamerican cultures.

Brooks left the position in 1981. His successor as museum director was ornithologist and former UNLV president (1973–78) Donald Baepler,  who was returning to the university campus after a three-year term as chancellor of the Nevada university system. Baepler was instrumental in establishing UNLV's Harry Reid Environmental Research Center, and the museum was reorganized to become one of the center's operating divisions. Baepler retired as museum director in 2004, retained a title as emeritus executive director of the museum.

In 1989 the museum was renamed in honor of Marjorie Barrick, a longstanding benefactor of the university. In 1980 Barrick, a prominent philanthropist married to a Las Vegas real estate developer, had gifted UNLV with an endowment of some $1.2 million from her late husband's estate, to fund an ongoing series of public lectures at the university. Speakers at the Barrick Lecture Series have included international figures and heads of state, such as Jimmy Carter, Gerald Ford, Mikhail Gorbachev and F. W. de Klerk.

In 2011, the Barrick closed its doors to undergo a change of hands with departments. The museum ceased to be affiliated with the Harry Reid Center and Department of Archaeology and became a part of the College of Fine Arts at UNLV. It reopened in 2012 as a contemporary art museum after undergoing drastic renovations, from its Collections Room to the Exhibition Hall, which changed how the public was able to interact with the space from piece to piece.

After the Las Vegas Art Museum (or LVAM) closed its doors in 2009, their collection was left without a home. In 2012 the LVAM collection moved to the newly renovated Barrick Museum, as part of a partnership between LVAM and UNLV. 

In 2017, the Marjorie Barrick Museum of Art celebrated its 50th anniversary. Under the direction of curator and artist, Alisha Kerlin, the Barrick continued to evolve into a notable locus of contemporary art in Southern Nevada. The museum was "rebranded" with "'of Art'" being added to its name and the institution established itself as an inclusive space with significant focus on “interdisciplinary programming,” "experimentation," and "community engagement" that reflects the social diversity of both UNLV and the broader Las Vegas community. The Barrick defined these aims in their Mission Statement, asserting: 

Since 2017, the Barrick has partnered with Clark County School District to increase access to K-12 students, with the Barrick often acting as their introductory experience to a museum. In 2020, the Barrick announced its partnership with the Las Vegas Womxn of Color Arts Festival, a Southern Nevada collective that aims to increase opportunities and visibility for “local womxn  artists who are Black, Indigenous, and People of Color.” 

Currently, the Marjorie Barrick Museum of Art is Las Vegas' only art museum.

Collections
The Collections at the Marjorie Barrick Museum of Art include:
The Barrick Art Collection
–The Barrick Museum is committed to collecting art of the present. This commitment is supported entirely through the generosity of artists and collectors who donate in-kind gifts of art. The bulk of the works in the collection include artists with ties to the greater Las Vegas valley forming a heritage collection of works created in and inspired by the Southern Nevada region.
The Barrick Cultural Collection
–The cultural collection began to form in 1969 and includes cultural objects from the American Southwest and Mesoamerica. The Pre-Columbian collection was initiated in 1979 with a gift from Dr. Michael C. and Mannetta Braunstein. Today, the museum's holdings include the Dr. Michael C. and Mannetta Braunstein Collection, a comprehensive collection of Pre-Columbian objects from nearly every culture of Pre-Columbian Latin America, as well as Mexican dance masks and retablos; Guatemalan, Bolivian, and Navajo textiles; Paiute and Hopi basketry; and Navajo jewelry. A variety of methodologies have been used at different times to collect, classify, analyze, and describe collection material, and the collections provide rich primary source information for multi-, cross-, and interdisciplinary studies. The Museum is compliant with guidelines mandates by the Native American Graves Protection and Repatriation Act (NAGPRA).
The LVAM Collection
–Works in the collection include national and international artists such as Llyn Foulkes and William T. Wiley, as well as a significant representation of UNLV graduates.
The Vogel Collection
–The Barrick Museum houses the Dorothy and Herbert Vogel 50x50 Collection. In 2010, UNLV was the recipient of 50 contemporary works from the celebrated collectors. Beginning in 1962, New York postal clerk, Herbert Vogel, and his librarian wife, Dorothy, began collecting contemporary works of art. The couple dedicated all of Herb's salary to buying art, and in a few decades had amassed a collection encompassing some 4,000 works. Today, these works form one of the most remarkable collections of contemporary art in America. Motivated by the desire to share their collection with the public, the couple developed a program to gift 50 works to one institution in each of the 50 states. This program became known as Vogel 50x50. The collection includes the work by such notables as Stephen Antonakos, Neil Jenney, Lynda Benglis, Lucio Pozzi, Edda Renouf, Bettina Werner and Richard Tuttle.

Exhibitions 
Exhibitions at the Marjorie Barrick of Art include: 

2020 
Lance L. Smith: In the Interest of Action 
FUTURE RELICS: Artifacts for a New World 
Yerman: Peaks & Valleys 
Excerpts: Works from the Marjorie Barrick Museum of Art
Nevada Touring Initiative Exhibition: Still Here Now 
Ashley Hairston Doughty: Kept to Myself 
The Other Side of Paradise 
Mikayla Whitmore: Between a Rock and a Cliff  
2019
Stars on the Ground: Works by John Torreano
Connective Tissue by Amanda Phingbodhipakkiya 
Zet Gold: On My Mountain 
Dry Wit 
Justin Favela and Ramiro Gomez: Sorry for the Mess 
Human Contact, curated by Samantha Castle
Tiger and The Eternal Struggle 
Axis Mundo: Queer Networks in Chicano L.A. 
2018
Jubilation Inflation
Soundscapes
Art in Context 
Andrew Schoultz: In Process: Every Movement Counts 
Exhibition: Identity Tapestry 
Exhibition: VESSEL: Ceramics of Ancient West Mexico 
Exhibition: Plural 
2017
Peripheral Flood Control Structures of Las Vegas
Preservation  
liminal  
Tested Ground
Casey Roberts 
Astronomy of the Asphalt Ecliptic
Play On Gary, Play On
Josh Azzarella Screenings
Abandon All Hope, Ye Who Enter Here
Process, curated by Matthew Gardocki
Masking, curated by Karen Roop 
2016
Edward Burtynsky: Oil 
In Transition: Female Figurines from the Michael C. and Mannetta Braunstein Collection 
Showing the Need for Connection 
Five 
Ellsworth Kelly
Unseen Selections from LVAM 
Teaching Gallery Staff Picks 
2015
Break Ups & Tear Downs
Style Moderne: Art Glass from the Ruth and Mel Wolzinger Collection
Recent Acquisitions
The Dorothy and Herbert Vogel Collection 
David Sanchez Burr: Citizen Speak
Deborah Aschheim: Kennedy Obsession
John Millei: If 6 Turned Out To Be 9, Selected Work
2014
Reflecting & Projecting: 20 Years of Design Excellence
Yesterday & Today
Panorama
Panorama+ Sesquicentennial Celebration of Nevada: Further Selections from the Nevada Arts Council's Artist Fellowship Program
Jerry Lewis: Painted Pictures
Sound & Video Installation: Derivative Presence by Yasmina Chavez & Javier Sanchez
Private/Public: Images of Devotion from 19th and Early 20th Century Mexico Opening
Art for Art's Sake: Selections from the Frederick R. Weisman Art Foundation
2013
Passage to the Future: Art from a New Generation in Japan
The Dorothy and Herbert Vogel Collection
The Kent Bicentennial Portfolio: Spirit of Independence
Pre-Columbian Sacrifice: The Burden of the Elite

Facilities
Marjorie Barrick Museum Auditorium
Marjorie Barrick Museum Exhibition Hall

Notes

References

External links
 Marjorie Barrick Museum official site

1967 establishments in Nevada
Art museums and galleries in Nevada
Buildings and structures in Paradise, Nevada
Museums established in 1967
Museums in the Las Vegas Valley
Mesoamerican art museums in the United States
Natural history museums in Nevada
Native American museums in Nevada
University museums in Nevada
University of Nevada, Las Vegas
UNLV Runnin' Rebels basketball